Česká Třebová railway station is a major railway junction in the Czech Republic, located in the town of Česká Třebová. It was opened in 1845 on the railway between Prague and Olomouc, and four years later another line to Brno was opened, making it one of the first railway junctions to be completed in the Czech lands, after Břeclav and Přerov.

Today it is served by international and intercity trains from Prague to Brno (and onwards to Austria, Slovakia and Hungary) and from Prague to Olomouc and Ostrava (and onwards to Slovakia and Poland).

Services

References

External links

Railway stations in Poland opened in 1845
Česká Třebová
Railway stations in Pardubice Region
Anton Jüngling railway stations